Mark Stephen Boyce  (born May 24, 1950) is a professor of population ecology in the University of Alberta Department of Biological Sciences, and the Alberta Conservation Association Chair in Fisheries and Wildlife.  Among other topics, he has written extensively on population viability analysis and resource selection functions. Early work was on demography and life history evolution. In 1993 he began research on habitat selection and the integration of habitats with population biology. He initiated research on elk in the Greater Yellowstone Ecosystem in 1977 and in 1988 was recruited by the National Park Service to build a simulation model to anticipate the consequences of wolf reintroduction in Yellowstone National Park. These simulation models were published by Yellowstone National Park to justify the ultimate release of wolves in 1995.  Several graduate students and postdoctoral fellows continued the Yellowstone work. 
After moving to the University of Alberta in 1999 most research has been on mammals and birds in Alberta.

In 2014, he was elected as a fellow of the Royal Society of Canada.

Select awards and recognition
 C. Hart Merriam Award, 2017, American Society of Mammalogists
 Miroslaw Romanowski Medal, 2016, Royal Society of Canada
 Fellow of the Royal Society of Canada
 TWS Fellow, The Wildlife Society
 Killam Annual Professorship, 2011–12, University of Alberta
 International Conservationist of the Year, 2007, Safari Club International Foundation
 Phi Kappa Phi, 1998, University of Wisconsin-Stevens Point
 Faculty Scholar Award, 1994, Sigma Xi-University of Wisconsin-Stevens Point Chapter.
 Distinguished Professorship, 1993, 1999 University of Wisconsin System, Madison.
 Vallier Chair of Ecology, 1993, University of Wisconsin-Stevens Point.
 Fulbright Scholar to India, 1992, U.S. Educational Foundation in India, Bangalore.
 N.A.T.O. Postdoctoral Fellowship, 1982–83, National Science Foundation, Univ. Oxford, UK.

References

External links
 University home page

Living people
Canadian ecologists
Fellows of the Royal Society of Canada
Place of birth missing (living people)
Academic staff of the University of Alberta
1950 births
20th-century Canadian scientists
21st-century Canadian scientists